Masoud Gholamalizad (born September 6, 1979) is an Iranian footballer who plays for PAS Hamedan in the Azadegan League.

Club career
Gholamalizad joined Paykan F.C. in 2009

Club career statistics

References

1979 births
Living people
Malavan players
Paykan F.C. players
Iranian footballers
Saba players
Association football goalkeepers